The 1875 Melbourne Cup was a two-mile handicap horse race which took place on Tuesday, 9 November 1875.

This year was the fifteenth running of the Melbourne Cup. This would be the first year of the race being held on a Tuesday.

This is the list of placegetters for the 1875 Melbourne Cup.

See also

 Melbourne Cup
 List of Melbourne Cup winners
 Victoria Racing Club

References

External links
1875 Melbourne Cup footyjumpers.com

1875
Melbourne Cup
Melbourne Cup
19th century in Melbourne
1870s in Melbourne